is a light novel publishing imprint affiliated with the Japanese publishing company Enterbrain, a division of Kadokawa Future Publishing. It was established on July 18, 1998 and is aimed at young adult male audience. The label accounted for 7% of the Japanese light novel market in 2009.

Published titles

!–9

A

B

C

D

E

F

G

H

I

J

K

L

M

N

O

P

R

S

T

U

V

W

Y

Z

References

External links
 

 
Book publishing company imprints
1998 establishments in Japan